A hogshead (abbreviated "hhd", plural "hhds") is a large cask of liquid (or, less often, of a food commodity).  More specifically, it refers to a specified volume, measured in either imperial or US customary measures, primarily applied to alcoholic beverages, such as wine, ale, or cider.

Etymology

English philologist Walter William Skeat (1835–1912) noted the origin is to be found in the name for a cask or liquid measure appearing in various forms in Germanic languages, in Dutch oxhooft (modern okshoofd), Danish oxehoved, Old Swedish oxhuvud, etc. The Encyclopædia Britannica of 1911 conjectured that the word should therefore be "oxhead", "hogshead" being a mere corruption.

Varieties and standardisation

A tobacco hogshead was used in British and American colonial times to transport and store tobacco. It was a very large wooden barrel.

The Oxford English Dictionary (OED) notes that the hogshead was first standardized by an act of Parliament in 1423, though the standards continued to vary by locality and content.  For example, the OED cites an 1897 edition of Whitaker's Almanack, which specified the gallons of wine in a hogshead varying most particularly across fortified wines: claret/Madeira , port , sherry . The American Heritage Dictionary claims that a hogshead can consist of anything from (presumably) . A hogshead of Madeira wine was approximately equal to 45–48 gallons (0.205–0.218 m3). A hogshead of brandy was approximately equal to 56–61 gallons (0.255–0.277) m3.

Eventually, a hogshead of wine came to be , while a hogshead of beer or ale is 54 gallons (250 L if old beer/ale gallons, 245 L if imperial).

A hogshead was also used as unit of measurement for sugar in Louisiana for most of the 19th century. Plantations were listed in sugar schedules by the number of hogsheads of sugar or molasses produced. A hogshead was also used for the measurement of herring fished for sardines in Blacks Harbour, New Brunswick and Cornwall.

Charts

See also
English units of wine casks

References

Imperial units
Wine packaging and storage
Brewing
Units of volume
Containers
Alcohol measurement
Customary units of measurement in the United States